Armless is a 2010 comedy film directed by Habib Azar and starring Daniel London, Janel Moloney, Matt Walton, Zoe Lister-Jones and Laurie Kennedy. It was written by Kyle Jarrow.

It was an official selection of the 2010 Sundance Film Festival, as part of the new category 'NEXT' which selects films for their innovative and original work in low- and no-budget filmmaking.

Premise
The film tells the story of John, a man who suffers from a psychological condition known as body integrity identity disorder in which an individual does not feel "whole" unless he loses one or more major limbs. John leaves his wife and goes to New York City to find a doctor to amputate his arms.

Production
Armless is Habib Azar's first feature film.  It was made in New York City with additional filming in Gillette, New Jersey.  The film was shot in 12 days from March 20 to April 2, 2008.

References

External links
 Official website
 
 Super Mirage (songs)

2010 comedy films
2010 films
2010s English-language films
Fictional amputees
American comedy films
2010s American films